Aestuarium is a Gram-negative, aerobic and non-motile bacterial genus from the family of Rhodobacteraceae with on known species (Aestuarium zhoushanense). Aestuarium zhoushanense has been isolated from a sample of tidal flat from the East China Sea in Zhoushan.

References

Rhodobacteraceae
Bacteria genera
Taxa described in 2019
Monotypic bacteria genera